Kim Myeong-sun (Hanja: 金明淳) (20 January 1896 – 22 June 1951) was a female Korean novelist and poet of the early 20th century.

Life
Kim Myeong-sun, who wrote under the pen names Tansil (탄실, 彈實) and Mangyangcho (망양초, 望洋草), was born in Pyongyang in 1896. Kim attended Chinmyeong Girls' School in Seoul in 1908 where she was considered a good student, but she was subjected to bullying about her background (her mother was a kisaeng) and mistreatment from her step-mother's family, leading her to drop out of school in 1911. In 1913 Kim went to Tokyo to study at Kojimachi's Girls' School, but did not complete her studies there, and soon returned to Korea to earn her degree at Sungmyeon's Girls' School. In 1919 Kim joined the Creation group, Korea's first literary circle, which was organized by Kim Dong-in and other Korean students in Tokyo. Kim briefly worked as a reporter for the newspaper Maeil Shinmun, and from 1927 to 1930 she worked in film. Kim suffered from financial problems and succumbed to mental illness late in life.

Work
Kim made her literary debut in 1917, in a magazine edited by Choe Nam-seon called Youth (소년, Sonyeon), with a novella titled Mysterious Girl (의문의 소녀, Uimun-ui sonyeo) She began publishing her poetry in 1921, and became known for her keen psychological portraits, with her 1921 novella Turkey (칠면조, Chilmyeonjo), which was published in the magazine Enlightenment (개벽, Gaebyeog). She continued publishing as late as 1925.

Relatively little is currently known about her work because, as Kim Yung-Hee notes, scholars have not studied her and are currently "attempting to excavate her lost works in order to better assess her position in the lineage of modern Korean women fiction writers."

Works in Translation
 A Girl of Mystery, in Questioning Minds (University of Hawaii Press, 2009) 

  Collected Works of the First Korean Female Writer Kim Myeong-sun  (BookLab, 2022) ISBN 979-11-6836-249-9 03810

Works in Korean (partial)
 Dubious Girl (의문의 소녀), 1917
 Turkey (칠면조 七面鳥), 1921
 Lonely People (외로운 사람들), 1924
 When I Look Back (돌아다 볼 때), 1924
 Tansil and Juyeong (탄실이와 주영이), 1924
 Night of Burning (뭇는 날 밤), 1925
 The Vault of Heaven (창궁 蒼穹), 1925
 The Guest (손님), 1926
 I Love (나는 사랑한다), 1926
 Like a Stranger (모르는 사람갓치), 1929

See also
Korean literature
List of Korean-language poets
List of Korean female writers

References

Sources

External links

 Kim Myong-sun 
  중앙일보 2009.01.14 
 성의 갈등과 상실을 민족사랑으로 승화시킨 여류문인 
 The 'Modern' Japanese (and Korean) Taisho Woman 
 Kim Myong-sun:Translation by Don Mee Choi 

1896 births
1971 deaths
Korean writers
Literature of Korea under Japanese rule
People from Pyongyang
Korean women poets
Korean educators
Korean scholars
20th-century Korean women
Korean journalists
Korean revolutionaries
South Korean feminists
Korean independence activists
20th-century Korean poets
20th-century women writers
20th-century journalists